Frederick Irvine Woodhouse (13 June 1912 – 8 July 1998) was an Australian track and field athlete who competed in the 1934 and 1938 British Empire Games.

At the 1934 Empire Games he won the bronze medal in the pole vault event. He was also a member of the Australian relay team which finished fourth in the 4×110 yards competition.

Four years later he finished seventh in the pole vault contest at the 1938 Empire Games.

References

External links
 Frederick 'Fred' Woodhouse at Australian Athletics Historical Results
  (archive)

1912 births
1998 deaths
Australian male sprinters
Australian male pole vaulters
Athletes (track and field) at the 1934 British Empire Games
Athletes (track and field) at the 1938 British Empire Games
Commonwealth Games bronze medallists for Australia
Commonwealth Games medallists in athletics
Medallists at the 1934 British Empire Games